Virtua Tennis 4 (Sega Professional Tennis: Power Smash 4 in Japan) is the third sequel to Sega's tennis game franchise, Virtua Tennis. It was released on PlayStation 3, Xbox 360, Microsoft Windows, Wii and PlayStation Vita. This is the first main series Virtua Tennis game to not have an arcade release before the console releases. An arcade version was also released, which is powered by the PC-based Sega RingEdge arcade system. There are two versions of the cabinet: an upright 4-player cabinet, and a deluxe 4-player cabinet.

Gameplay
The game supports the PlayStation Move controller on the PlayStation 3, the Kinect on the Xbox 360, and the Wii MotionPlus on the Wii. All previously mentioned devices are optional, although the Wii MotionPlus is required for actual motion-controlled gameplay in the Wii version, which is controlled with the Wii Remote held sideways if the accessory is unavailable. Virtua Tennis 4 allows the player to step into the shoes of some of the world's best tennis pros. The game supports stereoscopic 3D on the PlayStation 3. In the motion control mode of all three console versions, the player's character will automatically move sideways in reaction to where the ball approaches, but the player controls how close they want to be to the net by either holding down a particular button (Wii) or adjusting one's physical distance from the television screen (PS3 and Xbox 360).  There is a dynamic camera system in place, so when the ball is in the other half of the court, the camera pans out so that one can see one's position.

When the ball is coming towards the player, it glides into a first person viewpoint where the player can see their racquet in front of him and time their swing accordingly. The player can twist the racquet to adjust its face when it connects with the ball, allowing skilled players to apply spin.

Players
A trailer was released on the YouTube channel of Sega America on January 1, 2011 with a partial list of players that were confirmed for the game. On their blog entry published the same day, the seven new inclusions were revealed for the game.

Six days later, on the Facebook page of the game, the full list of players was released. On 31 March, 3 legends were included to the game, but those are exclusive for PlayStation 3 (along with 2 new mini-games).

As well as these players included in the game, the user has the option to create up to eight of their own players in the World Tour mode.

Playable Characters

  Roger Federer
  Novak Djokovic
  Andy Murray
  Rafael Nadal
  Andy Roddick
  Juan Martín del Potro
  Gaël Monfils
  Fernando González
  Tommy Haas
  Philipp Kohlschreiber
  Andreas Seppi

  Caroline Wozniacki
  Maria Sharapova
  Svetlana Kuznetsova
  Venus Williams
  Laura Robson
  Anna Chakvetadze
  Ana Ivanovic
  Jim Courier (Unlockable)
  Boris Becker (PS3 exclusive unlockable)
  Stefan Edberg (PS3 exclusive unlockable)
  Patrick Rafter (PS3 exclusive unlockable)

Development
This is the first game to be developed by the original Virtua Tennis team Sega AM3 since 2006.

Despite the fact that Sega opted to skip Gamescom, Virtua Tennis 4 was revealed at the convention at Sony's booth.

World Tour Edition
An updated Vita port, entitled "Virtua Tennis 4: World Tour Edition" was released on December 17, 2011, and was to simultaneously launch with the PlayStation Vita, along with being exclusive to Sony's new handheld.

The World Tour addition included many exclusive features. More mini-games were added, along with touch controllers. The players can also play in first person mode, and control the game using the Vita's gyroscope. Players may use the handheld's front camera to take a photo of their face, and have the game construct a character based on the photo (similar to the mechanics of the game Reality Fighters). After the game downloads the image, the users edit the player in a light character customization screen. Different game templates were also added, allowing the user to play in various time periods, ranging from the early 20th century to one-hundred years in the future.

Two players may now play using the same system, by turning it sideways in the style of Pong, with each participant using a combination of touch control and buttons or analog to play. Augmented reality can be used to bring tennis players featured in the game to life on your system. The users select a player, and have them brought into onto screen, with the background being whatever is facing the second camera on the system.

Online play had also been touched up on, allowing players to share stats, and allowing users to share comments on the other's game home screen.

The game itself was enjoyed by players, critics, and actual tennis players alike (See Reception for more on the reviews). Tennis star Andy Murray stated that he enjoyed the game while playing against a representative from Sega, stating that he found it and entertaining, praised the graphics, and said his in game character was an accurate representation of him.

As of July 2017, Virtua Tennis 4 is the only tennis simulation game available for the PlayStation Vita.

Reception

GameZone gave the game a 6/10, stating "By and large, Virtua Tennis 4 does adhere strongly to its roots, bringing enough excitement to lure a wider audience. However, it would be useful for a study to be conducted of similar titles, so that these updated features could find their way into the beloved franchise." GameSpot had reviewed the Xbox 360 version and gave it 5.5 out of 10. It stated that "In almost every respect, Virtua Tennis 4 is outclassed by its rival Top Spin 4" because Virtua Tennis 4 has annoying music, too simple controls and unrealistic sound effects.

References

2011 video games
Sega-AM3 games
Kinect games
PlayStation 3 games
PlayStation Move-compatible games
PlayStation Vita games
Wii games
Wii MotionPlus games
Windows games
Games for Windows certified games
Xbox 360 games
Video games developed in Japan
Virtua Tennis
Tennis video games
Video games set in Argentina
Video games set in Australia
Video games set in Brunei
Video games set in Canada
Video games set in Chicago
Video games set in China
Video games set in the Czech Republic
Video games set in Dallas
Video games set in Egypt
Video games set in Germany
Video games set in London
Video games set in Los Angeles
Video games set in Montenegro
Video games set in the Netherlands
Video games set in New York City
Video games set in Paris
Video games set in Rome
Video games set in Russia
Video games set in Spain
Video games set in Sweden
Video games set in Vancouver